Metochi (Greek: Μετόχι) is a village and a community in the municipal unit of Larissos, western Achaea, Greece. The community consists of the villages Metochi, Vouprasio, Neo Vouprasio and Lappas. Lappas was the seat of the former municipality of Larissos. Metochi is located in the plains near the Ionian Sea coast, 5 km south of Araxos, 3 km southwest of Araxos Airport, 14 km west of Kato Achaia and 32 km west of Patras. The Prokopos lagoon, which is fed by the river Larissos, is 1 km north of Metochi. Lappas is on the Greek National Road 9 (Patras - Pyrgos) and on the railway from Patras to Pyrgos.

Historical population

See also
List of settlements in Achaea

References

Populated places in Achaea